Sanavirón Island is an island lying off Northeast Glacier, southeast of Audrey Island, Debenham Islands, in Marguerite Bay on the Fallières Coast. It was charted by the Argentine Antarctic Expedition, 1950–51, as two small islands (probably because of overlying ice) and named "Islotes Sanavirón" after the Argentine ship Sanavirón, which was used for the hydrographic survey of the area. The feature has been determined to be a single island.

See also 
 List of Antarctic and sub-Antarctic islands

References

Islands of Graham Land
Fallières Coast